The North West Junior Hockey League is a Junior "B" Ice Hockey league operating in the Peace River region of Alberta and British Columbia, Canada, sanctioned by Hockey Canada. The winner of Northwest "B" playoffs earns the chance to compete for the Western Canadian Junior "B" Crown, the Keystone Cup.  To earn the right to compete, they must face off against the winners of the other Alberta "B" leagues in the Russ Barnes Trophy.

Teams

Former teams 

The Whitecourt Wolverines disbanded in the 2012 off-season to make way for the relocation of the St. Albert Steel of the Alberta Junior Hockey League, becoming the new Whitecourt Wolverines.

Champions

NHL alumni
Matt Walker

See also
 List of ice hockey teams in Alberta

References

External links
Official website of the North West Junior Hockey League

Ice hockey leagues in British Columbia
Ice hockey leagues in Alberta
B
Sports leagues established in 1994
1994 establishments in Canada